The EMD SW9 is a model of diesel switcher locomotives built by General Motors Electro-Motive Division between November 1950 and December 1953. Additional SW9s were built by General Motors Diesel in Ontario Canada from December 1950 to March 1953. Power was provided by an EMD 567B 12-cylinder engine, producing .

786 examples of this model were built for American railroads and 29 were built for Canadian railroads.

Design and production 
The SW9 was EMD's successor to the SW7. Like the SW7, the SW9 retained a power output of 1,200 hp and the same general design. It differed in lacking the upper hood vents found in the SW7, and with the installation of a 567B engine to replace the 567A found in the SW7.

Starting in October 1953 a number of SW9s were built with the 567BC engine. In December 1953, one locomotive, Weyerhaeuser 305, was built with a 567C engine. The 567C was subsequently installed on the SW9's successor, the SW1200.

In addition to the single units produced, ten TR5 cow-calf paired sets were produced (eight for the Union Pacific Railroad, and two for the Union Railroad of Pittsburgh). The Union Railroad also bought an additional two TR5B "calves".

Original buyers

SW9 locomotives built by Electro-Motive Division, USA

SW9 locomotives built by General Motors Diesel, Canada

TR5 locomotives built by Electro-Motive Division, USA

SW1000R 

In 1994 Amtrak acquired nine SW9s from various railroads and had them rebuilt by the National Railway Equipment Company. These switchers were reclassified as EMD SW1000R.

See also 
List of GM-EMD locomotives
List of GMD Locomotives
 Detailed specs

References

External links 

SW0009
SW0009
B-B locomotives
Railway locomotives introduced in 1950
Diesel-electric locomotives of the United States
Locomotives with cabless variants
Standard gauge locomotives of the United States
Standard gauge locomotives of Canada
Diesel-electric locomotives of Canada
Shunting locomotives